Abigail Kubheka (born 7 December 1939) is a South African singer, songwriter and actress. On the SABC TV series Generations: The Legacy, she plays the role of Zondiwe Mogale, the mother of Tau Mogale (Rapulana Seiphemo) and Tshidi Phakade (Letoya Makhene).

Personal life 
Kubeka was born 7 December 1939 in Orlando East. She attended a missionary boarding school in Kilnerton. From a young age, she showed an interest in singing.

Career 
Abigail Kubeka started singing with popular musicians such Miriam Makeba, Hugh Masekela and has performed with many others including Thandi Klaasen.

In 2014, Kubeka received a Lifetime Achievement Award from the South African Film and Television Awards (SAFTAS), and in 2016 was honoured with a Lifetime Achievement Award at the Wawela Music Awards (WMA) in Johannesburg. In the early 2000s Kubeka won the Lifetime Achievement Award for best musician and jazz industrial.

Kubeka has appeared in films including An African American (2016), The Jakes Are Missing (2015), and The Long Run (2001), in which she sang with Busi Mhlongo.

Filmography

Filmography

Television

Accolades

Abigail won an award called Wamela, on a lifetime achievement, for the approvement she does for the country, and was also nominated at the Durban Film Festival, with Thuso Mbedu, Connie Ferguson, Leleti Khumalo and Sihle Ndaba.

Wamela Music Awards (Won - Lifetime Achievement Award 2001)
Durban Film Festival (Nominated - Actress In Supporting Role 2014)
South African Film and Television Award (Won - Best Actress, The Long Run 2015)
SAM Awards (Singer of the Year - Nominated 2017)

References

External links

South African actresses
1941 births
Living people